Mouhcine Cheaouri (born 15 January 1989) is a Moroccan track and field athlete who competes in the pole vault. He is a two-time African champion in the event and has a personal best of 5.20 metres.

Born in the city of Oujda, Cheaouri made his international debut at the 2007 Pan Arab Games, where he finished in sixth place. He improved his personal best to 5.20 m in 2008 and quickly ascended to the top of the regional scene by winning the gold medal at the 2008 African Championships in Athletics, beating decathletes Larbi Bouraada and Willem Coertzen.

He did not compete in 2009 and 2010, but returned to form in 2011 with a clearance of 5.20 m in Meknes. He placed ninth at the 2011 Military World Games, was runner-up at the Arab Athletics Championships, then took the gold medal at the 2011 Pan Arab Games. A vault of 5.10 m was enough to secure his second continental win at the 2012 African Championships in Athletics.

In 2016 he tested positive for stanozolol and was banned from competition for four years between 30 April 2016 and 9 June 2020.

Achievements

References

External links

Living people
1989 births
People from Oujda
Moroccan male pole vaulters
Doping cases in athletics
Moroccan sportspeople in doping cases
Islamic Solidarity Games competitors for Morocco